NGC 950 is a barred spiral galaxy in the constellation Cetus. It is approximately 205 million light-years away from the Solar System and has a diameter of about 85,000 light-years. The object was discovered in 1886 by American astronomer and mathematician Ormond Stone.

See also 
 List of NGC objects (1–1000)

References 

Barred spiral galaxies
0950
Cetus (constellation)
009461